Tithonia diversifolia  is a species of flowering plant in the family Asteraceae that is commonly known as the tree marigold, Mexican tournesol, Mexican sunflower, Japanese sunflower or Nitobe chrysanthemum. It is native to Mexico and Central America but has a nearly pantropical distribution as an introduced species. Depending on the area they may be either annual or perennial. It has shown great potential in raising the soil fertility in soils depleted in nutrients. Originating in Mexico; research has shown its potential in benefiting poor African farmers. This plant is a weed that grows quickly and has become an option as an affordable alternative to expensive synthetic fertilizers. It has shown to increase plant yields and the soil nutrients of nitrogen (N), phosphorus (P), and potassium (K).

Description
The large, showy flowers are yellow to orange colored and 5–15 cm wide and 10–30 cm long. Leaves are sub-ovate, serrate, acute, 10 to 40 cm long, simply or mostly 3-7 lobed, somewhat glandular, and slightly grayish beneath. The seeds are achenes, 4-angled, and 5mm long. The seeds are spread by wind. The leaves of the plant alternate in sides they grow on, which is where the plant gets the name diversifolia. This is accompanied by flowers which are yellow in colour and range from 6–13 cm in length. It can grow throughout the year and its seeds are spread through way of wind, water, and animals.

History and geography
This plant was originally domesticated in Mexico and spread to other parts of Central and South America and north into the United States. It was brought over to parts of Africa and Asia as an ornamental plant and has become an invasive weed that is widely spread. It is most commonly found in areas with an altitude between 550m and 1950m. It is commonly found scattered among rivers and roadsides. In Asia and Latin America this plant is also referred to as kembang bulan (Indonesian and Javanese), jalacate (Spanish), buatong (Thai) and dã quỳ (Vietnamese).

Symbolism and uses
In Japan, towards the end of the Meiji Period, they were imported as ornamental plants although seldom cultivated there. Having a characteristic bitter taste, they were  used to induce a fever to help fight poisoning, although not used for direct medicinal purposes. There is also the story of the species being introduced to Japan by Nitobe Inazo, hence its Japanese name, the Nitobe chrysanthemum (ニトベギク; Nitobegiku).
It is the official symbol of Da Lat city, Vietnam.
They are sold in herbal medicine markets in Taiwan.
It is the provincial flower of Mae Hong Son Province, Thailand.
T. diversifolia can be used as a green fertilizer for farmers. It can also be used as chicken feed, fuelwood, soil erosion control, and building materials. For fertilization, it is used as a mulch which can be spread on top of the soil or buried beneath it. The advantages here is that using the plant as a fertilizer has proven to increase crop yields. T. diversifolia has the ability to restore phosphorus in high amounts to the soil. T. diversifolia as a fertilizer contains 1.76% N, 0.82% P, and 3.92% K. All three properties are lower in cattle manure, and P is higher in poultry and swine manure.

Growing conditions
Tithonia diversifolia can grow in many different environmental conditions. It has a moderate drought tolerance. It is ideally grown in areas with an annual rainfall ranging from 1000–2000 mm and a temperature of 15-31 degrees Celsius. This plant does not require a large amount of nutrients because it is able to increase the amount of essential nutrients in the soil itself. As a weed it spreads rapidly which allows farmers to obtain large amounts for the use of fertilization.

Economics
A study on the use of this green fertilizer on tomato plants shows that this is a useful method to increase crop yields in order to benefit the farmer’s wealth. However, this is not without a serious look at the labour requirements. A different study found that, with maize, the overall labour demand versus the financial prospects is not worthwhile, especially in areas of unpredictable rainfalls. This same study also found that growing T. diversifolia on farmer land is not as beneficial from an economic standpoint. Instead, it is better to harvest from an off site location and transport to the fields. From this study, fields that received only a P fertilizer yielded an income to the farmer of $50USD/ha. When only T. diversifolia was applied, this income rose to $494USD/ha. The latter results are high, as another study showed an increase of only to $116USD/ha.

Time issues
Harvesting and distributing this fertilizer over the land by hand is very labour-intensive. The best yields come when T. diversifolia is grown off the land as to not take up growing space. For this reason, when time spent on labour has been factored, this approach may not be beneficial to a farmer.

Constraints to wider adoption
While T. diversifolia has moderate drought tolerance, the amount of rainfall that the African subtropics receives may not be enough to support the growing of this biomass. T. diversifolia currently grows in humid and semi humid areas in Africa. However, no evidence was found to suggest that it had been attempted in desert conditions.

Practical information
Tithonia diversifolia can be used as organic fertilizer biomass. The biomass refers to materials that are derived from the plant, such as its foliage, being worked into the soil as a dry fertilizer. Since its use as fertilizer requires high labour, it is recommended for use with high value crops such as tomato, kale, carrot, and maize. For this use, the plant is first grown in hedges around the edges of harvest land. It is important though to keep the maximum amount of growing area a farmer has. The green stems (not the woody stems), leaves, and flowers can be removed from the plant at a farmer selected time, though it is recommended that cutting every 5 months will give a plentiful amount of nutrients in the biomass. The biomass can also be used as a mulch and can be left on top of the soil to decompose into the ground. It has been found that the biomass from T. diversifolia breaks down rapidly and releases nutrients quickly. When applying the mulch or biomass to the soil, it should be applied at the minimum amount of one ton to every hectare of land. However, the best yield is given when 5 tons/hectare is applied. The downside here is that a lot of foliage is needed to cover a small area of land because it has a high water content. Mixing this biomass with a synthetic fertilizer will bring higher yields. A study found that when applying tithonia with triple superphosphate (TSP) that the yields increased by 220% compared to a control test containing only an inorganic nitrogen fertilizer (Urea). When using T. diversifolia it should be supplemented with a Mg fertilizer as this nutrient is lacking in quantity when compared to other green fertilizers.

References

External links

Heliantheae
Plants described in 1883
Flora of Mexico
Garden plants of Central America
Medicinal plants
Invasive plant species in Sri Lanka